The Saddle and Clubs Leisure Park is a mixed-used venue which features the Santa Ana Park racetrack in Naic, Cavite, Philippines. It hosts the Philippine Racing Club.

SCLP occupies  and houses around 1,000 thoroughbreds as of 2018.

History

In 1996, the Philippine Racing Club acquired a 147-hectare property in Naic, Cavite for a planned relocation of Santa Ana Park, and made a joint-venture agreement with the Sta. Lucia Realty and Development Corporation for the development of a new venue.

In 2009, Saddle and Clubs Leisure Park was opened, and the Santa Ana Park racetrack was transferred to this site. The former site was converted into a mixed-used development under the name Circuit Makati.

See also
 Philippine Racing Club

References

Horse racing venues in the Philippines
Sports in Cavite
Horse racing in the Philippines
Buildings and structures in Cavite
2009 establishments in the Philippines
Sports complexes in the Philippines